Nunavut is divided into three time zones: Eastern, Central and Mountain.

Mountain Standard Time
Mountain Standard Time MST GMT−7
 all communities in the Kitikmeot Region, and
 all portions of the Kivalliq Region West of 102° West

Central Standard Time
Central Standard Time CST GMT−6
 Between 85° West and 102° West, (Resolute, Repulse Bay, Baker Lake, west shore of Hudson Bay), except on Southampton Island.

Eastern Standard Time
Eastern Standard Time EST GMT−5
 East of 85° West* (Sanikiluaq, Cape Dorset, Hall Beach, Igloolik, Arctic Bay, Grise Fiord and all points east), except Southampton Island, which does not observe daylight saving time.

History
When the territory was created in 1999, the new government believed a unified time zone would make it easier for its citizens to conduct business. Public hearings noted there was support for this idea, although disagreement as to which time zone to observe. The territorial government announced that effective October 31, 1999 all clocks would change to Central Standard Time. Iqaluit, the capital located in the far eastern edge of the Eastern time zone, was unhappy with this decision. The city council voted against the measure and vowed to keep the city on Eastern time. As late October 1999 approached the city council backed down and agreed to accept the change to Central time "in the spirit of working with the Nunavut government". They agreed to review the decision in six months.

After hearing complaints from a number of communities in late 1999 and early 2000 the government modified the time zone. They announced the territory would now be on Eastern Standard Time year round, daylight saving time would no longer be observed. The change would be effective October 29, 2000. Many western communities supplied from the south by communities on Mountain time felt this put them too much out of synchronisation with their neighbours. After some debate it was decided the far western communities would be allowed to change back to Central time on November 4, 2000. However they would observe daylight saving time in the summer. This would unify Nunavut with one time in the summer and keep western communities a constant one-hour difference from their southern neighbours. On November 6, 2000, the territorial government announced that Kugluktuk and Cambridge Bay would be the only two communities that would continue to change their clocks twice a year.

In April 2001 Nunavut reverted to the three previous time zones it inherited from the Northwest Territories administration of the region, thus meaning its time zones had changed four times in a 17-month period. The only community to keep its clocks on standard time year-round (without adjusting twice a year for daylight saving time) was Coral Harbour on Southampton Island, which had not observed DST going back well before the creation of Nunavut.

In 2007, most of the United States and Canada increased the number of weeks each year when daylight saving time would be in effect. Those areas of Nunavut that observed daylight saving time followed suit. Whereas previously DST ran from the first Sunday of April to the last Sunday of October, beginning in 2007 it ran from the second Sunday in March to the first Sunday in November.

References

External links
 An Act to Amend the Interpretation Act (Time Zones) (in force since April 1, 2001)
 Time Zone and Daylight Saving Time Regulations (Regulations of Nunavut, R-045-99, in force from October 31, 1999 until April 1, 2001)
 Daylight Saving Time Regulations, 2001 (Nunavut Gazette, vol. 3, No. 4, page 5) (in force from April 1, 2001 until February 19, 2007)
 SOR/2001-182 (federal proclamation: Proclamation establishing three different time zones in Nunavut, for the purposes of the definition of “standard time” in the Interpretation Act, May 23, 2001)
 Michaela Rodrigue, Iqaluit council backs down on time zone issue, Nunatsiaq News, October 1999 

Time in Canada